The Queensland Railways A10 Neilson class locomotive was a class of 0-4-2 steam locomotives operated by the Queensland Railways.

History

Overview
The A10 Neilson class comprised 13 locomotives. Eight were built in 1865 and 1866 by Neilson and Company, Glasgow for the Southern & Western Railway operating out of Ipswich and another four for the Central Railway operating out of Rockhampton. One engine was also constructed for Peto, Brassey and Betts, a railway contractor building the line to Toowoomba. This was later purchased by the Queensland Railway in 1876. All engines were fitted with injectors instead of feed pumps when built. All of the Central Railway examples were later transferred to the Southern & Western Railway.

4D10 tank engine conversions
Four engines were converted to 4D10 class 2-4-4T tank engines between 1887 and 1890.

20th century
Five engines survived the turn of the century although four of them were written off in 1902. N°3 continued in use shunting Bowen Jetty until 1914. It was then stored at North Ipswich Railway Workshops and restored to working order for the Railway Pageant in 1936. Afterwards it was preserved near Countess Street in Roma Street railway yard before being moved to Queen's Park at Ipswich in 1959. In the 1980s it moved to the North Ipswich Railway Workshops.

N°6 was sold to Gibson & Howes in 1896 for use on their Wattawa line. It was reboilered in 1955 and continued to serve the company until 1965 when it was steamed from Bundaberg to Brisbane for the Queensland Railways Centenary Celebrations, operating a reenactment of the first Queensland Railways service from Ipswich to Grandchester. It was retained in operational condition until 1969 when placed on display at the Redbank Locomotive Museum. In 1988, the Australian Railway Historical Society commenced a restoration of the locomotive with it being returned to traffic in May 1991 and today is part the Queensland Rail Heritage Fleet at the Workshops Rail Museum.

Class list

Preservation
N°3 has been preserved in Queen's Park, Ipswich, it moved to the North Ipswich Railway Workshops in the 1980s
N°6 is preserved at the Workshops Rail Museum in working order

See also

Rail transport in Queensland
List of Queensland steam locomotives

References

External links

Neilson locomotives
Railway locomotives introduced in 1865
A10 Neilson
0-4-2 locomotives
3 ft 6 in gauge locomotives of Australia